Ann Sothern  (born Harriette Arlene Lake; January 22, 1909 – March 15, 2001) was an American actress who worked on stage, radio, film, and television, in a career that spanned nearly six decades. Sothern began her career in the late 1920s in bit parts in films. In 1930, she made her Broadway stage debut and soon worked her way up to starring roles. In 1939, MGM cast her as Maisie Ravier, a brash yet lovable Brooklyn showgirl. The character proved to be popular and spawned a successful film series (Congo Maisie, Gold Rush Maisie, Up Goes Maisie, etc.) and a network radio series (The Adventures of Maisie).

In 1953 Sothern moved into television as the star of her own sitcom Private Secretary. The series aired for five seasons on CBS and earned Sothern three Primetime Emmy Award nominations. In 1958 she starred in another sitcom for CBS, The Ann Sothern Show, which aired for three seasons. From 1965 to 1966, Sothern provided the voice of Gladys Crabtree, the title character in the sitcom My Mother the Car. She continued her career throughout the late 1960s with stage and film appearances and guest-starring roles on television. Due to health issues she worked sporadically during the 1970s and 1980s.

In 1987 Sothern appeared in her final film The Whales of August, starring Bette Davis and Lillian Gish. Sothern earned her only Oscar nomination for Best Supporting Actress for her role in the film. After filming concluded she retired to Ketchum, Idaho, where she spent her remaining years before her death from heart failure in March 2001. Lucille Ball, alongside whom she appeared on Ball's program The Lucy Show on multiple occasions, called Sothern "the best comedian in the business, bar none."

Early life 
Sothern was born in Valley City, North Dakota, the oldest of three daughters born to Walter J. Lake and Annette Yde. She had two younger sisters, Marion and Bonnie. Her maternal grandfather was Danish violinist Hans Nielsen.

Her mother was a concert singer, while Sothern's father worked in importing and exporting. Harriette and her sisters were raised in Minneapolis, Minnesota. Her parents separated when she was four years old (they would later divorce in 1927). At the age of five she began taking piano lessons. She later studied at McPhail School of Music, where her mother taught piano. She began accompanying her mother on her concert tours when her school schedule permitted.

By age 11 she had become an accomplished pianist and was singing solos in her church choir. At age 14 she began voice lessons and continued to study piano and music composition. As a teen at Minneapolis Central High School she appeared in numerous stage productions and directed several shows.

During her high school years she entered the annual state-sponsored contests for student musical composers and won three years in a row. In 1926 she graduated from high school.

Her mother moved to Los Angeles, where she worked as a vocal coach for Warner Bros. studios. Sothern moved with her father to Seattle, where she attended the University of Washington, dropping out after one year.

Career

Early years 
While visiting her mother in California she won a role in the Warner Bros. revue The Show of Shows. She did a screen test for MGM and signed a six-month contract. She appeared in bit parts and walk-on roles, but soon grew frustrated with only appearing in small roles. She then met Florenz Ziegfeld at a party. Ziegfeld offered her a role in one of his productions. When MGM decided not to pick up her option she moved to New York City to take Ziegfeld up on his offer.

On Broadway in 1931 she had leading roles in America's Sweetheart and Everybody's Welcome.

Film and radio 
In 1934 she signed a contract with Columbia Pictures. Harry Cohn changed her name to Ann Sothern.  "Ann" was chosen in honor of her mother and "Sothern" was chosen for Shakespearean actor E. H. Sothern. While at Columbia she mainly appeared in B-movie roles. After two years the studio released her from her contract. In 1936 she was signed by RKO Radio Pictures and, after a string of films that failed to attract a large enough audience, she left RKO. She signed with Metro-Goldwyn-Mayer shortly after leaving RKO.

After signing with MGM Sothern was cast as brassy Brooklyn burlesque dancer Mary Anastasia O'Connor, known professionally as Maisie Ravier, in Maisie (1939). MGM originally acquired the Maisie property for Jean Harlow, but Harlow died in June 1937, before a final script was completed. (The Harlow inspiration remained, as the second Maisie feature, Congo Maisie, was based on MGM's Red Dust. Sothern approximated the Jean Harlow role opposite John Carroll in the Clark Gable role.)

After years of struggling and appearing in supporting parts Sothern found major success with Maisie. The film was profitable for MGM, as were the string of Maisie comedy sequels that followed (box office proceeds from Maisie pictures financed MGM's more costly dramas). From 1939 to 1947 she appeared in 10 Maisie films. A review of Swing Shift Maisie (1943) by Time magazine praised Sothern and described her as "one of the smartest comediennes in the business". The popularity of the film series led to her own radio program, The Adventures of Maisie, broadcast on CBS from 1945 to 1947, on Mutual Broadcasting System in 1952, and in syndication from 1949 to 1953. Due to her popularity from the Maisie films MGM head Louis B. Mayer paid $80,000 to purchase film rights to the Broadway production of DuBarry Was a Lady especially for Miss Sothern. When Sothern rejected the revised script MGM decided to cast Lucille Ball (Sothern's best friend in real life). Shortly after completing filming of Maisie Gets Her Man in 1942 Sothern was cast in title role in the film version of Panama Hattie (1942), opposite Red Skelton. Panama Hattie had been a hit on Broadway with Ethel Merman in the title role, but was plagued with production problems after MGM attempted to shoot the film version. After a disastrous preview in November 1941 MGM decided to delay release to retool the production. The film's original director was replaced, the script was rewritten, and several scenes were reshot. While the film received mediocre to poor reviews it was a smash box office hit with audiences.

In 1943 she appeared in a seventh Maisie film Swing Shift Maisie followed by a role in the war drama Cry 'Havoc'. The following year Sothern starred in the eighth Maisie film Maisie Goes to Reno before taking time off to have her first child. She returned to the screen in 1946 in Up Goes Maisie, followed by the final Maisie film Undercover Maisie. Sothern appeared in two musical films in 1948, April Showers opposite Jack Carson and Words and Music starring an all-star cast of MGM actors, singers and dancers. In 1949 she appeared in the Academy Award-winning film A Letter to Three Wives for 20th Century Fox. Sothern received excellent reviews for her performance but the acclaim failed to stimulate her career, which had begun to wane in the late 1940s. In 1949 Sothern contracted hepatitis, which she would battle for the next three years. After Sothern became ill MGM canceled her contract.

Television 

By the early 1950s Sothern was appearing only in supporting roles, in such films as crime drama The Blue Gardenia (1953). In need of money due to her mounting medical bills she turned to television. In 1953 she was cast as the lead in the series Private Secretary. Sothern portrayed Susan Camille "Susie" MacNamara, a secretary working for New York City talent agent Peter Sands (Don Porter). The series aired on CBS on alternate weeks with The Jack Benny Program. Private Secretary was a hit with audiences, routinely placing in the top 10, and Sothern was nominated for a Primetime Emmy Award for her role on the series four times. In 1957 Private Secretary was renewed for a fifth season, but Sothern left the series after she had what she later described as a "violent fight" with producer Jack Chertok over profits from the series. Sothern owned 42% of the show and later sued Chertok for $93,000 in back profits from the series.

She returned to television the following year in The Ann Sothern Show. Sothern starred as Kathleen "Katy" O'Connor, the assistant manager at the fictitious Bartley House Hotel. The series originally co-starred Ernest Truex as Katy's timid boss Jason Macauley, who was routinely outshone by Katy, and bullied by his domineering wife Flora (Reta Shaw).  Ratings for the series were weak, and after 23 episodes the show was retooled. Sothern's co-star from Private Secretary, Don Porter, signed on as Katy's boss James Devery. The addition of Porter added romantic tension to the series and helped to improve ratings. In 1959, the series won a Golden Globe Award for Best Television Series – Musical or Comedy. During the series' second season Jesse White, who also starred in Private Secretary, joined the cast. Ratings for the series remained solid until CBS moved The Ann Sothern Show to Thursdays for its third season. Scheduled opposite the ABC series The Untouchables, ratings dropped substantially and The Ann Sothern Show was canceled in 1961.

Later years 
After The Ann Sothern Show ended, she returned to films in the political drama The Best Man (1964), opposite Henry Fonda and Cliff Robertson. She was nominated for a Best Supporting Actress Golden Globe for her work in the film. That same year, she portrayed a prostitute in the psychological thriller Lady in a Cage, starring Olivia de Havilland. In 1965, she had a recurring role on her friend Lucille Ball's The Lucy Show as the "Countess Framboise" (née Rosie Harrigan).  After Ball's long-time co-star Vivian Vance announced plans to leave the show, the press speculated that Sothern would be Vance's replacement. Sothern denied the rumors and, ultimately, the series continued without Vance or Sothern.

In 1965, Sothern co-starred in the TV comedy series My Mother the Car, opposite Jerry Van Dyke. The show was typical of then-popular situation comedies featuring a flying nun (The Flying Nun), a talking horse (Mister Ed), a domestic witch (Bewitched), or other surreal premises. Van Dyke played a struggling lawyer and family man who discovers a dilapidated, vintage 1928 automobile in a used-car lot. The antique auto speaks to him — in Ann Sothern's voice. It seems the car is the reincarnation of Van Dyke's mother. Van Dyke restores the car to its original condition and takes it home, where it bemuses his family and becomes the envy of a zealous collector. Sothern was never seen in the series; only her voice was heard, reacting tartly to zany happenings around her.

She continued the rest of the 1960s working in guest roles in television and the occasional film role. In an Alfred Hitchcock Hour episode, entitled "Water's Edge", Sothern turned in a most impressive performance. In 1972, Sothern appeared in the Sid and Marty Krofft television special Fol-de-Rol. The next year, she played the domineering mother of a homicidal son in psychological horror film The Killing Kind. In 1974, she traveled to Hong Kong to shoot the martial arts film Golden Needles. She portrayed the role of Ann, a mahjong parlor owner. Sothern's next role was in the 1975 action/comedy film Crazy Mama starring Chloris Leachman. For the rest of the decade, health problems forced her to cut back on her career. She worked sporadically in television and in stage productions, including a small role in the horror film The Manitou with Tony Curtis (1978).

Sothern returned to television in 1985 in the role of "Ma Finney" in an adaptation of one of her old films, A Letter to Three Wives. Sothern's final film was The Whales of August in 1987. Her role as the neighbor of elderly sisters, played by Lillian Gish and Bette Davis, earned her the only Best Supporting Actress Academy Award nomination of her career. After filming, Sothern retired from acting and moved to Ketchum, Idaho, where she spent her remaining years.

Other ventures 
Over the course of her career, Sothern also managed several businesses and production companies. In the 1950s, she opened the Ann Sothern Sewing Center in Sun Valley, Idaho, which sold fabric, patterns, and sewing machines. She also owned a cattle ranch in Idaho named the A Bar S Cattle Company. Sothern owned Vincent Productions, Inc. (named for Sothern's patron saint Vincent de Paul) which produced her first series Private Secretary, and Anso Productions which produced The Ann Sothern Show.

In addition to acting, Sothern pursued a musical career. During her hiatus from Private Secretary in 1954, she starred in her own nightclub act featured in clubs in Reno, Las Vegas, and Chicago. In the late 1950s, she formed the A Bar S Music Company and released Sothern Exposure, her first album in 1958.

Personal life

Marriages and child 

Sothern married actor and band leader Roger Pryor in September 1936. They separated in September 1941 and Sothern filed for divorce in April 1942, charging Pryor with mental cruelty. Their divorce became final in May 1943. Less than a week after her divorce from Pryor she married actor Robert Sterling. The couple had one daughter, Patricia Ann "Tisha" Sterling, before divorcing in March 1949.

Health problems 
Shortly after filming A Letter to Three Wives Sothern contracted infectious hepatitis after getting an impure serum shot while she was in England for a stage performance. She was confined to her bed where she continued to work on the Maisie radio program while she recuperated. Sothern later said that her illness had restored her faith. With the help of friend Richard Egan she converted to Roman Catholicism in 1952.

In 1974 Sothern was injured while appearing in a Jacksonville, Florida, stock production of Everybody Loves Opal when a prop tree fell on her back. The accident left her with a fractured lumbar vertebra and damaged nerves in her legs. Her injuries required hospitalizations where she was put in traction. She was also required to wear back braces. Due to her forced inactivity Sothern gained a considerable amount of weight. In addition to her physical pain Sothern also developed depression. Sothern credited her "optimistic belief" and Roman Catholic faith for getting her through. For the remainder of her life Sothern experienced numbness in her feet and required a cane to walk.

Death 
On March 15, 2001, Sothern died from heart failure at her home in Ketchum at the age of 92. She was buried in Ketchum Cemetery.

Sothern has two stars on the Hollywood Walk of Fame: for motion pictures, found on 1612 Vine Street; and television, on 1634 Vine Street.

Filmography

Stage work 

Smiles (1930)
America's Sweetheart (1931)
Everybody's Welcome (1931)
Of Thee I Sing (1932–1933)
Faithfully Yours (1951)
God Bless Our Bank (1963)
The Solid Gold Cadillac (1965; 1974)
The Glass Menagerie (1966)
Gypsy (1967)
Glad Tidings (1967–1968)
Mame (1968)
My Daughter, Your Son (1970)
Barefoot in the Park (1970)
Butterflies Are Free (1970–1971; 1972)
Personal Appearance (1971)
Everybody Loves Opal (1974)
The Duchess of Pasadena (1978)

Awards and nominations

Further reading 
Briggs, Colin. Cordially Yours, Ann Sothern. Albany, Georgia: BearManor Media, 2006.

References

Sources

External links 

 
 
 
 Movie Magazine International: Ann Sothern
 
 
  Ann Sothern fan page

1909 births
2001 deaths
20th-century American actresses
20th-century American businesspeople
Actresses from Minnesota
Actresses from North Dakota
American film actresses
American television actresses
American radio actresses
American silent film actresses
American stage actresses
Converts to Roman Catholicism
Metro-Goldwyn-Mayer contract players
Columbia Pictures contract players
People from Valley City, North Dakota
American people of Danish descent
Actresses from Minneapolis
Traditional pop music singers
University of Washington alumni
20th-century American singers
California Republicans
Idaho Republicans
People from Ketchum, Idaho
20th-century American women singers
Catholics from Idaho
Catholics from North Dakota
20th-century American businesswomen
Central High School (Minneapolis, Minnesota) alumni